is a railway station in the city of Shimada, Shizuoka Prefecture, Japan, operated by the Ōigawa Railway. Its location was formerly the town of Kawane, which was merged into Shimada in 2008.

Lines

History
On  2 August 2019 the station was planned as an information desk for sightseeing nearby Shimada-Kanaya IC on Shin-Tōmei Expressway.。

In 2020,  on 25 September the station was named Kadode Station, and on 12 November, the station opened.。

Station layout
The station is contiguous with Kadode Ooigawa The platform is 42 m long and unstaffed. The waiting room is attached.

Adjacent stations

|-
!colspan=5|Ōigawa Railway

Passenger statistics

Surrounding area
 Japan National Route 473

See also
 List of Railway Stations in Japan

References

External links
 Ōigawa Railway home page

Stations of Ōigawa Railway
Railway stations in Shizuoka Prefecture
Railway stations in Japan opened in 2020
Shimada, Shizuoka